Aproaerema anthyllidella is a moth of the family Gelechiidae. It is found in most of Europe, Kyrgyzstan, Iran and North America.

The wingspan is 10–12 mm. The forewings are  dark slaty-fuscous, often paler-sprinkled; stigmata hardly perceptible, plical followed by a whitish-ochreous dot; a small whitish-ochreous triangular spot, usually somewhat outwardly oblique, on costa at 2/3, occasionally obsolete; often a very small whitish-ochreous spot on tornus opposite; vein 6 rising out of 7. Hindwings are rather light grey. The larva is blackish-grey; on 2-4 dorsal line and segmental incisions obscurely whitish; spiracular series of whitish spots; head and plate of 2 black.
 
Adults are on wing from May to June and again from August to September in two generations per year.

The larvae feed on various herbaceous plants, including Anthyllis vulneraria, Chamaecytisus, Coronilla, Cytisus, Dorycnium rectum, Galega officinalis, Glycine max, Hymenocarpos circinnatus, Lathyrus pratensis, Lathyrus tuberosus, Lotus corniculatus, Medicago lupulina, Medicago sativa, Melilotus alba, Onobrychis viciifolia, Ononis repens, Ononis rosifolia, Ononis spinosa, Ornithopus, Oxytropis pilosa, Phaseolus vulgaris, Psoralea bituminosa, Trifolium pratense, Trifolium repens, Trigonella monspeliaca, Vicia cracca and Vicia faba. Larvae of the first generation mine the leaves of their host plant. They make a small full depth blotch, often with extensions. The frass is concentrated in one corner of the mine. Older larvae live freely among spun leaves, but may still they make occasional fleck mines by feeding on the leaf tissue from a small opening. Larvae can be found from April to May and again from July to August, but it is not known how the species overwinters.

Subspecies
Aproaerema anthyllidella anthylidella
Aproaerema anthyllidella elachistella (Stainton, 1859)

References

Moths described in 1813
Aproaerema
Moths of Asia
Moths of North America
Moths of Europe